Arthur Thomas may refer to:

Sports
 Arthur Thomas (Cambridge University cricketer) (1816–1895), English cricketer
 Arthur Thomas (baseball) (1864–1895), African-American baseball catcher and first baseman
 Arthur Thomas (Australian cricketer) (1869–1934), Australian cricketer
 Arthur Thomas (Glamorgan cricketer) (1895–1953), Welsh cricketer
 Arthur Thomas (New Zealand cricketer) (1881–1965), New Zealand cricketer
 Arthur Thomas (rugby league) (1901–1970), of the 1920s and '30s for Great Britain, England, Leeds, and York
 Arthur Thomas (footballer) (1938–2007), for Linfield F.C. from Ballymena United F.C. in November 1965

Other
 Arthur Goring Thomas (1850–1892), English composer
 Arthur Lloyd Thomas (1851–1924), Governor of Utah 
 Arthur W. Thomas (1891–1982), chemist and professor who specialized in colloid chemistry
 Arthur Devere Thomas (1895–1973), George Cross recipient
 Arthur S. Thomas (1935–2001), Chief of Chaplains of the U.S. Air Force
 Arthur Allan Thomas (born 1938), New Zealander pardoned for the murders of Harvey and Jeanette Crewe
 Arthur Thomas (Emmerdale), fictional character on the British soap opera Emmerdale
 A. Nutter Thomas (1869–1954), Anglican Bishop of Adelaide

See also
 
 Thomas Arthur (disambiguation)